Christine Daure-Serfaty (1926 – 28 May 2014) was a French human rights activist and writer who distinguished herself in Morocco where she embraced the fight of the victims of King Hassan II, during the "Years of Lead," and from afar, played a major role in the evolution of the regime and the human rights in Morocco. She was the wife of Abraham Serfaty, a Moroccan dissident. In 1974 Abraham Serfaty was sentenced to life imprisonment. It was in September 1999 that the new Moroccan king, Mohammed VI, permitted Abraham Serfaty’s return to Morocco.

Biography
Christine Daure arrived in Morocco in 1962. In 1972, in Casablanca, she hid two political dissidents wanted by the Moroccan police: Abraham Serfaty who ended up sentenced to life in prison in 1974, and Abdellatif Zeroual, who died under torture after his arrest. During these years, she fought to save Abraham Serfaty from the same fate. She finally obtained the right to marry him in jail in 1986 and settled in Rabat.

She was the first person to denounce the existence of the secret prison of death Tazmamart, which was denied for years by the Moroccan authorities.  The following year, the book "Notre ami le roi" ("Our friend the King")  by Gilles Perrault, a book she helped to write though her name didn't appear, mentioned the prison at a political level, radically changing the image of Hassan II's regime in the western world and contributing to its evolution in the following years.

As a result, many prisoners were, one after the other, saved from certain death. Her husband Abraham Serfaty was released from jail in 1991, after seventeen years of imprisonment, torture and isolation, and was immediately expelled (to France). Christine Daure-Serfaty was also expelled, without any explanation, after being arrested and detained at a police station for one night.

It was only after eight years of exile and two months after Hassan II's death, in September 1999, that the couple was authorized by King Mohamed VI of Morocco to return to Morocco.

She was previously married to the French politician Pierre Aguiton, with whom she had a son Christophe Aguiton, a left-wing trade-unionist born in 1953, and a daughter, Lise Aguiton-Moro.

Christine Daure-Serfaty died on 28 May 2014 in a hospital in Paris.

References

Further reading
Tazmamart, une prison de la mort au Maroc, 1992
Mauritania, 1993
La mémoire de l'autre, 1993
Rencontres avec le Maroc, 1993
La femme d'Ijoukak, 1997
Letter from Morocco, 2003

External links
Bibliomonde
  Amnesty International Report 1997
 Notre ami le roi 

Human rights abuses in Morocco
1926 births
2014 deaths
Politics of Morocco
French expatriates in Morocco
French human rights activists
Women human rights activists
French women writers